Garfield Smith (born November 18, 1945) is an American former professional basketball player who played in the National Basketball Association (NBA) and American Basketball Association (ABA). He was drafted with the tenth pick in the third round of the 1968 NBA Draft by the Boston Celtics. In two seasons in the NBA, Smith averaged 2.7 points per game and 2.1 rebounds per game.  Smith also played one season in the ABA for the San Diego Conquistadors where he averaged 3.7 points per game and 4.3 rebounds per game.

References

1945 births
Living people
American men's basketball players
Basketball players from Kentucky
Boston Celtics players
Boston Celtics draft picks
Centers (basketball)
Eastern Kentucky Colonels men's basketball players
People from Campbellsville, Kentucky
Power forwards (basketball)
San Diego Conquistadors players
1970 FIBA World Championship players
United States men's national basketball team players